is a railway station on the privately operated Choshi Electric Railway Line in Chōshi, Chiba, Japan.

Lines

Station layout
The station consists of one side platform serving a single track, and is unstaffed.

History
The railway closed in November 1917, but was reopened on 5 July 1923 as the Chōshi Railway. Motochōshi was the name of the area at the time the station was built.

The station was used in the filming of the 1985 NHK TV drama Miotsukushi.

The station became unstaffed from 1 January 2008.

The station was renovated in August 2017 as part of a special Nippon Television 24-hour TV project.

Passenger statistics
In fiscal 2015, the station was used by an average of 86 passengers daily (boarding passengers only). The passenger figures for past years are as shown below.

Surrounding area
 Chōshi Shimizu Elementary School

See also
 List of railway stations in Japan

References

External links

  

Stations of Chōshi Electric Railway Line
Railway stations in Chiba Prefecture
Railway stations in Japan opened in 1913